Torcé (Gallo: Torczae) is a commune in the Ille-et-Vilaine department in Brittany in northwestern France.

Population
Inhabitants of Torcé are called Torcéens in French.

See also
Communes of the Ille-et-Vilaine department

References

External links

Official website Torcé 

Mayors of Ille-et-Vilaine Association 

Communes of Ille-et-Vilaine